Circus Avenue is the third studio album released by Spanish boyband Auryn. It debuted at No.1 on the PROMUSICAE official Spanish Albums Chart and includes the band's first No.1 single, "Puppeteer". The album is the band's first release to be recorded solely in English (with the exception of the two bonus tracks). The album also spawned the hit single "Saturday I'm In Love".

On April 14, 2015, a special edition of the album was released, entitled Circus Avenue Night, which contains a DVD of the band's Circus Avenue tour as well as a CD which contains the entire album, as well as the brand new single "Tic Tac", which appears exclusively on this version. The band worked with a number of producers on the album, including English-based production team Red Triangle and Swedish producers Jörgen Elofsson and David Kreuger.

Track listing

Charts

Weekly charts

Year-end charts

Certifications

See also
List of number-one albums of 2014 (Spain)

References

2014 albums
Auryn albums